Edmund Lawrence (December 8, 1952 – July 16, 2015) was an American professional basketball player. He played as a center for one season in the National Basketball Association (NBA) as a member of the Detroit Pistons during the 1980–81 season. He attended McNeese State University where he was selected in the fifth round of the 1976 NBA Draft by the Cleveland Cavaliers, but was waived by them before seeing playing time. Lawrence signed with the San Antonio Spurs after being placed on waivers by Cleveland. His tenure in San Antonio did not last long as he was again waived before the start of the 1980–81 season.

Lawrence played for the Anchorage Northern Knights of the Continental Basketball Association during the 1980–81 season.

References

External links

1952 births
2015 deaths
American expatriate basketball people in Finland
American expatriate basketball people in the Philippines
American men's basketball players
Anchorage Northern Knights players
Basketball players from Louisiana
Centers (basketball)
Cleveland Cavaliers draft picks
Detroit Pistons players
McNeese Cowboys basketball players
Philippine Basketball Association imports
Sportspeople from Lake Charles, Louisiana
Tampereen Pyrintö players